Philip Edward Pettey (born April 17, 1961) is a former American football guard in the National Football League for the Washington Redskins.  After four years in the United States Marines straight out of high school, he played college football at the University of Missouri and made academic all-Big 8.  He was the assistant offensive line coach for the New Orleans Saints in 2000 and the tight ends coach for the New York Jets from 2001 to 2003.  He also held coaching jobs with colleges such as Louisiana State, Southern California and Pittsburgh.

References

1961 births
Living people
Sportspeople from Kenosha, Wisconsin
Players of American football from Wisconsin
American football offensive guards
Missouri Tigers football players
Washington Redskins players
LSU Tigers football coaches
USC Trojans football coaches
Pittsburgh Panthers football coaches
New Orleans Saints coaches
New York Jets coaches
Mary D. Bradford High School alumni